Staindrop is a village and civil parish in County Durham, England. According to the 2011 UK Census the population was 1,310, this includes the hamlets of Cleatlam and Killerby.

History 
Around the year 1018, King Canute gave the manors of Raby and Staindrop to Durham Priory. In 1131 Prior Algar granted the manor to an Anglo-Saxon named Dolfin "son of Uhtred", the earliest recorded direct male ancestor of the great Neville family which built as their seat Raby Castle in the north part of the manor. The grant was possibly merely a confirmation of the holding by this family from before the Norman Conquest of 1066. When doing homage to the Prior for his holding he reserved his homage to the kings of England and of Scotland and to the Bishop of Durham and was "no doubt a man of consequence", probably an aristocratic Northumbrian of high birth. In February 1203-4 King John confirmed to the prior and convent all their privileges and vast possessions, including "Staindrop and Staindropshire with the church".

Notable buildings 

Raby Old Lodge dates back to the 14th century, and was once an outpost of Raby Castle, it was extensively altered between 1897-1899, it is now used as holiday accommodation.

Other buildings and historic features of note include Scarth Hall, built as the village hall in 1875 and used during the Second World War to provide NAAFI facilities to soldiers stationed in Staindrop, it is now used as a community hub after undergoing refurbishment in 2016. Snotterton Hall was a former fortified manor house dating back to the 15th century, demolished in 1831 and now rebuilt as a farmhouse.

Religion 
The Church of England parish church of St Mary (formerly dedicated to St. Gregory) is Anglo-Saxon. The first church on the site is recorded as having been built in the 8th century (771AD) and the church has been extended and remodelled across the centuries. The church contains monuments including effigies of members of the Neville family, it underwent restoration around 1849.  A Congregational chapel also stood from 1868 until the 1970s.

Governance 
Staindrop was part of the local government district of Teesdale from 1974 before it was abolished as part of the 2009 structural changes to local government in England. For the purposes of Durham County Council elections, the village is located in the Barnard Castle East ward.

The village lies within the Bishop Auckland parliamentary constituency, which is under the control of the Conservative Party. The current Member of Parliament, since the 2019 general election, is Dehenna Davison.

Community and culture 
The village has two schools, Staindrop Church of England Primary School with approximately to 170 pupils aged 3–11, and Staindrop Academy, a coeducational secondary school  with over 500 pupils aged 11–16, which also houses a community gym, opened in 2020.

The last remaining public house, The Wheatsheaf is a former coaching inn, former pubs include The Black Swan, The Black Lion Inn and The Royal Oak. Other amenities in the village include a SPAR convenience store, a newsagent housing the local post office, tea rooms, hairdressers and several holiday cottages.

The Staindrop Carnival, an annual parade and fair, celebrated its centenary in 2020. The village football team, Staindrop F.C. play in the Darlington Sunday invitation league, an affiliate of the Durham County Football Association in 2020-2021 they completed a famous double by winning the Alan Rusk trophy as well as the league cup. Raby Castle Cricket Club play in the Darlington & District Cricket League A, having remained unbeaten and winning the league title in the 2019 season.

Notable people 
The surveyor Jeremiah Dixon, who with Charles Mason calculated and laid out the Mason–Dixon line in North America, is buried in Staindrop. His unmarked grave is in the Quaker burial ground adjoining the old Friends' Meeting House. Thomas Pynchon's historical fiction novel Mason & Dixon mentions Staindrop as containing Jeremiah Dixon's favourite public house.

 Birthplace of Charles Bungay Fawcett, on 25 August 1883
 Birthplace of Charles Wilbraham Watson Ford, on 17 July 1896
 Major William Kemp Trotter, a former Deputy Lieutenant of County Durham, and his wife Mary Holcroft

References

External links

 
Villages in County Durham
Civil parishes in County Durham
Burial sites of the House of Neville